Bowling for Soup, is the self-titled debut studio album by American rock band Bowling for Soup. The album was recorded at C & L Studios in Summer 1994, and was released the following September on the band's own self-formed record label Que-so Records. This release was limited to 3,000 copies. The band released digitally remastered versions of Bowling for Soup, Cell Mates, and Tell Me When to Whoa through iTunes and Amazon.com in October 2011.

Track listing

Video for "Thirteen"
The video of "Thirteen" shows the band playing the song in different places. Lance Morrill appears. Erik Chandler and Jaret Reddick had long hair, and Chris Burney had hair.

Personnel
Bowling for Soup:
 Chris Burney — guitars, backing vocals
 Erik Chandler — vocals, bass, backing vocals
 Lance Morrill — drums, backing vocals
 Jaret Reddick — vocals, guitar, backing vocals
Production
 Produced by James Chavez and BFS
 Mixed by James Chavez and Jaret Reddick
 Mastered at Outback Studios, Wichita Falls, TX by Chris and Johnny Devine
 Photography by Wayne Wagner and Cody Garcia
 Manufactured and printed by Disc Makers, New Jersey, U.S.A.

References

External links

Bowling for Soup at YouTube (streamed copy where licensed)

Bowling for Soup albums
1994 debut albums